Lifumpa Yande Mwandwe (born 29 December 2000) is an English professional footballer who plays as a forward or winger for Canadian Premier League club HFX Wanderers.

Early life
Born in London, Mwande moved to Wirral as a youngster, and played for the Wirral Schoolboys. He joined the Shrewsbury Town youth system in 2013. During the 2017/18 season, he scored 20 goals for the Shrewsbury U18s.

Club career
He made his senior debut for Shrewsbury Town, as a last-minute substitute, in a 3–0 victory against West Bromwich Albion U21s in an EFL Trophy group-stage match on 3 October 2017. In October 2018, he signed his first professional contract with Shrewsbury. In August 2019, he went on loan to Welsh club Newtown in the Cymru Premier. In June 2020, he was released by Shrewsbury.

In February 2021, he returned to Newtown on a permanent contract. On 17 April 2021, he scored a brace against Haverfordwest County. In January 2022, he extended his contract with the club for an additional 18 months. In the 2021-22 season, he was the most fouled player in the league and led the league in completed dribbled, helping the club earn a 2022–23 UEFA Europa Conference League qualification spot. He was named to the league Team of the Season, and was also nominated for the Young Player of the Year award, which was ultimately won by Mael Davies. In his final match for the club on 14 July 2022, ahead of his transfer to Canada, he scored a goal in the second leg of the UEFA Conference League 1st qualification round match against Havnar Bóltfelag of the Faroe Islands, to level the score on aggregate and converted the final kick in the penalty shootout to help Newtown advance to the next round.

In July 2022, he joined Canadian Premier League club HFX Wanderers FC through the 2023 season, with a club option for 2024. He made his debut for the club on 23 July against FC Edmonton as a substitute, in which he drew a penalty that was converted by Samuel Salter to tie the match. In January 2023, he returned to Newtown on a short-term two month loan, until 28 February. He made his loan debut on 7 January against Connah's Quay Nomads.

International career
In 2018, he trained with the Zambia national under-20 team. He was then named to the roster for their 2019 Africa U-20 Cup of Nations qualification matches against Rwanda U20.

Career statistics

References

External links 

Living people
Shrewsbury Town F.C. players
Newtown A.F.C. players
Association football midfielders
2000 births
English footballers
Association football forwards
Footballers from Greater London
Cymru Premier players
Cymru Alliance players
English people of Zambian descent
Black British sportspeople
English expatriate footballers
Expatriate soccer players in Canada
English expatriate sportspeople in Canada
Canadian Premier League players
HFX Wanderers FC players